Gavin Mackie Ewing (born 21 January 1981) is a Zimbabwean cricketer. He is a right-handed batsman and bowls a right-arm offbreak. As a teenager, he spent a short time at Potchefstroom Boys High in South Africa before returning to Zimbabwe to complete his schooling at Falcon College in Esigodini.

He plays for Zimbabwe and Matabeleland. His current Test high batting score is 71, with an average of 18. He was initially called up for the 2003–04 tour in Australia, having previously played in the 1999 Under-19 World Cup and finished in the list of the top ten wicket players. He is a confident and aggressive middle-order batsman, and amongst the list of fifteen cricketers who had a coming together with the country's Cricket Union in 2004. He returned to the side in November of that year. In 2009, he spent a season playing cricket in Devon for Paignton CC, having a reasonable season before returning to Zimbabwe.

1981 births
Alumni of Falcon College
Living people
Cricketers from Harare
White Zimbabwean sportspeople
Matabeleland cricketers
Zimbabwe One Day International cricketers
Zimbabwe Test cricketers
Zimbabwean cricketers